Joogiya (兆佳) was a clan of Manchu nobility.

Notable Figures

Males 

 Shusai (舒赛)
Hetu (赫图)
 Wengguotuo (翁果托)
 Duo'ertai (多尔泰）
 Saikesehe (塞克塞赫), served as third rank military official (参领)

Females 
Imperial Consort
 Noble Lady
 Noble Lady Bu (d. 1717), the Kangxi Emperor's noble lady, the mother of Princess Duanjing (1674–1710)

Princess Consort
 Primary Consort
 Yinxiang's primary consort, the mother of Princess (1707–1726), Hongdun (1711–1728), Hongjiao (1713–1764), Princess Hehui (1714–1731), Hongkuang (1716–1722), Hongxiao (1722–1778) and Shou'en (1725–1727)

 Concubine
 Nurhaci's concubine, the mother of Abai (1585–1648)

References

Manchu clans